The International Journal of Mental Health Nursing (IJMHN) is a bimonthly peer-reviewed medical journal covering psychiatric and mental health nursing. It is published by Wiley and is the official journal of the Australian College of Mental Health Nurses.

Publication history
The journal started life in 1980 as the Journal of the Australian Congress of Mental Health Nurses, and was rebadged as the Australian Journal of Mental Health Nursing in 1990. The journal was relaunched in July 1992 as a fully refereed (peer reviewed) journal. In 1994 it was renamed Australian and New Zealand Journal of Mental Health Nursing before obtaining its current name in 2002. Articles have been published online since May 2002. From 2008, issues going back to 1999 were retrospectively made available online. The last printed version of the journal was volume 24, issue 6 (December 2015).

The list of chief editors, arranged by year commenced, is as below:

 1980 Dennis Cowell
 1982 Ron Dee
 1986 Owen Sollis
 1987 Linda Salomons
 1988 Andrew King
 1990 Michael Clinton
 1999 Michael Hazelton
 2004 Brenda Happell 
 2015 Kim Usher (University of New England).

The journal has had a social media presence since June 2012, and has had an active Social Media Editor since 2017.

Abstracting and indexing
The journal is abstracted and indexed in:
CINAHL
Current Contents/Social & Behavioral Sciences
MEDLINE/PubMed
PsycINFO
Science Citation Index Expanded
Scopus
Social Sciences Citation Index

According to the Journal Citation Reports, the journal has a 2021 impact factor of 5.100, ranking it 2nd out of 125 journals in the category "Nursing".

References

External links

Psychiatric and mental health nursing journals
Wiley (publisher) academic journals
Publications established in 1992
English-language journals
Bimonthly journals